Second-generation gender bias refers to practices that may appear neutral or non-sexist, in that they apply to everyone, but which discriminate against a gender because they reflect the values of the gender who created or developed the setting, usually a workplace. It is contrasted with first-generation bias, which is deliberate, usually involving intentional exclusion.

An example of second-generation gender bias is that leaders are expected to be assertive, so that women who act in a more collaborative fashion are not viewed as leaders, but women who do act assertively are often perceived as too aggressive. This kind of bias, or gender stereotyping, can be entirely unconscious.

First- and second-generation bias
The first-generation bias was a function of practices that were once legal. With legislative changes that make gender discrimination illegal in the workplace, in sports, and in college, for instance, second-generation bias refers to the subtle forms of inherent and unconscious bias that stems from organizational practices and patriarchal structures that Harvard Business School professor Robin Ely argues explains the persistent glass ceiling, or the failure of achieving significant change in gender parity  in corporate boardrooms, senior management positions, and in the general workforce. Despite the passing of a half century since the modern social movement for women's rights began, many of the same public gender gaps persist. "By 2015, one might have expected significant leaps forward in corporate gender diversity. But the numbers don’t lie, and the barriers, both overt and subtle, seem to be stuck in place."

Due to the subtle and unintentional nature of second-generation gender bias, women may deny or be unaware of the barriers to the same social rewards and opportunities men seem to have in obtaining management and leadership positions in all aspects of social and political life from education to business to politics in any patriarchal society. It can also lead people to de-legitimize constructive debates about gender disparities. A significant cost of second-generation gender bias is that previously successful junior level women may experience identity threat as they move up the ladder of success and face the need to re-situate their identity roles in positive and negative ways. All of these make the struggle for gender equality seem more psychological and stressful as if the barrier is solely created in their own minds.

Workplace discrimination
Second-generation gender bias is a form of discrimination against women because their practices reflect the values of the men who created the setting, which is often the workplace. Gender bias is one of the most regularly appearing biases shown in the workplace, as opposed to racist bias or personal bias. Few people in workplaces with gender diversity recognize it as a problem, and many people, including those who work in single-gender workplaces, are not aware it is happening at all. An example of second-generation gender bias is that in some work places, women are not being hired because the company is a male-dominated workplace. Work cultures may be created to appear to be neutral and unbiased, but they are not.

Faye Crosby argues that second-generation gender bias goes unnoticed in the workplace, not only by men but also by women. Many women experience second-generation gender bias in the workplace, but fail to notice that such discrimination is happening. Women who do recognize second-generation gender bias may feel more power-driven, rather than taken advantage of, when thinking of the discriminatory acts that they have experienced in the past. According to Herminia Ibarra, women who recognize these discriminatory acts feel empowered to take action to counter those effects by pushing themselves to achieve leadership opportunities they are qualified for, seeking out sponsors and supporters, and negotiating their work arrangements. Masculine traits, such as strength, confidence, and definitive, are typically preferred in the workplace because they make the company appear to be more driven and confident in its success. However, when a woman shows these "masculine traits", she is often thought of as bossy, rude, and full of herself. Experts say that men are more of the natural-born leaders because of their biological preferences. Women are strong leaders as well because they can be compassionate towards those under them, which in turn could result in better relationships and stronger teams.
While women are attending college and earning degrees now more than ever, statistics show that women are not advancing in school like men are. There has been an increase in the number of women who are receiving their doctorates, but the increase does not correspond with the number of women that are becoming professors and taking high level positions, such as president. Many people believe discrimination ended in the mid '60s, when campaigns for ending discrimination still existed. Sandra Bem (1981) made known the gender schema theory, which explains how an individual's sex identity is essential to the culture in which one is brought up. These ideas are still interfering with women advancing in society. Meyerson and Fletcher (2000) propose that gender discrimination will never go away, it has just "gone underground."

The main difference between first-generation gender bias and second-generation gender bias is whether or not it is intentional. In first-generation gender bias, one intentionally discriminates against another, whereas in second-generation gender bias, the discrimination is not intentional.

The Harvard Business Review documented reports from women in the workplace who suggested that organizational practices and policies were holding them back: My firm has the very best intentions when it comes to women. But it seems every time a leadership role opens up, women are not on the slate. The claim is made that they just can’t find women with the right skill set and experience.It is exactly because second-generation bias is not intentional and not directly harmful that causes it to be pernicious. It leads to discomfort, disconnection from male colleagues and superiors, and often creates a context for exclusion in which women feel unwelcome and uneasy about their social position and access to greater remuneration compared to their male colleagues.

Examples of second-generation gender bias in the workplace
Bias in Engineering
is a specific example of second-generation bias is how in some places, companies are having trouble keeping women engineers as employees. These women are not staying in their field because of their low self-esteem in regards to failing in front of their mostly male counterparts. These women may feel intimidated and outnumbered by the males in the workplace, causing them to fear failing while being watched by an audience that is majority male-dominant. If there wasn't such discrimination in the workplace regarding women in charge and working in a place full of men, studies show that women would not have such low self-esteem, and they would possibly continue to try their best to succeed in their field. This behavior of women is sometimes unconscious and is caused because of this second-generation gender bias.

Bias in Law
The law favours characteristics associated with masculinity such as long working hours and inflexible working patterns; plus male networking opportunities (such as golf and male-exclusive dinners/ drinks) where men are able to make connections and fraternal contacts. Long working hours mean that legal professionals are expected to be workaholic and this does not factor in that women often have more caring responsibilities than men; where women undertake family responsibilities it can be seen as a lack of commitment to work.

Where women cannot adhere to masculine expectations, or network through male events, this can affect career progression. Statistics from 2015 show that although 50% of women are now solicitors, only 22% of partners in the top 100 law firms are women. Female lawyers are also often over-represented in areas such as legal aid work, family law and sexual offences prosecutions. This could be because these areas are made more accessible to women.

Possible solutions 
Ending this second-generation gender bias is hard because men and women alike do not realize discrimination is taking place, or deny that it is occurring. Because this problem is over-looked so frequently, it is not recognized as a major problem in many workplaces. One example of a solution could be as easy as using initials instead of a full name to hide gender bias when applying for employment in the workplace. Although this would not change the bias entirely, it would make employers review the resumes without paying attention to gender. Budden et al. (2007) proved that when women were judged by their work blindly, the number of women hired increased. Another easy solution would be to have employees come together and list the biases to create better understanding of the biases taking place. This would allow women to focus less on how they might be being judged by others, and focus more on being good employees and leaders.

References

Further reading

Chauvinism
Employment discrimination
Sexism